Kurazag-e Now (also Romanized as Kūrazag-e Now; also known as Kūzarag and Kūzarak) is a village in Kuh Mareh Sorkhi Rural District, Arzhan District, Shiraz County, Fars Province, Iran. At the 2006 census, its population was 379, in 78 families.

References 

Populated places in Shiraz County